Bernie Rule (born 29 June 1957) is a New Zealand cricketer. He played in one List A and three first-class matches for Wellington in 1982/83.

See also
 List of Wellington representative cricketers

References

External links
 

1957 births
Living people
New Zealand cricketers
Wellington cricketers
Cricketers from Christchurch